This is a list of the extreme points of Brazil.

Latitude and longitude
The following points are farther north, south, east or west than any other location.

Brazil

 Northernmost point: Monte Caburaí, Roraima
 Northernmost town: Uiramutã, Roraima
 Southernmost point: Arroio Chuí, Rio Grande do Sul
 Southernmost town: Chuí, Rio Grande do Sul
 Easternmost point: Ilha do Sul, Ilhas de Martim Vaz, Espírito Santo
 Easternmost town: Vila dos Remédios, Fernando de Noronha
 Westernmost point: Serra do Divisor, Acre
 Westernmost town: Mâncio Lima, Acre

Brazil (mainland)

 Northernmost point: Monte Caburaí, Roraima
 Northernmost town: Uiramutã, Roraima
 Southernmost point: Arroio Chuí, Rio Grande do Sul
 Southernmost town: Chuí, Rio Grande do Sul
 Easternmost point: Ponta do Seixas, Paraíba
 Easternmost town: João Pessoa, Paraíba
 Westernmost point: Serra do Divisor, Acre
 Westernmost town: Mâncio Lima, Acre

By state

Acre 
 Northernmost town: Mâncio Lima
 Southernmost town: Epitaciolândia
 Westernmost town: Mâncio Lima
 Easternmost town: Acrelândia

Alagoas 
 Northernmost town: Jacuípe
 Southernmost town: Piaçabuçu
 Westernmost town: Delmiro Gouveia
 Easternmost town: Maragogi

Amapá 
 Northernmost town: Oiapoque
 Southernmost town: Vitória do Jari
 Westernmost town: Laranjal do Jari
 Easternmost town: Amapá

Amazonas 
 Northernmost town: São Gabriel da Cachoeira
 Southernmost town: Lábrea
 Westernmost town: Atalaia do Norte
 Easternmost town: Nhamundá

Bahia 
 Northernmost town: Curaçá
 Southernmost town: Mucuri
 Westernmost town: Formosa do Rio Preto
 Easternmost town: Jandaíra

Ceará 
 Northernmost town: Jijoca de Jericoacoara
 Southernmost town: Penaforte
 Westernmost town: Granja
 Easternmost town: Icapuí

Espírito Santo 
 Northernmost town: Mucurici
 Southernmost town: Presidente Kennedy
 Westernmost town: Dores do Rio Preto
 Easternmost town: Conceição da Barra

Goiás 
 Northernmost town: São Miguel do Araguaia
 Southernmost town: Itajá
 Westernmost town: Mineiros
 Easternmost town: Mambaí

Maranhão 
 Northernmost town: Carutapera
 Southernmost town: Alto Parnaíba
 Westernmost town: São Pedro da Água Branca
 Easternmost town: Araioses

Mato Grosso 
 Northernmost town: Apiacás
 Southernmost town: Alto Taquari
 Westernmost town: Colniza
 Easternmost town: Santa Terezinha

Mato Grosso do Sul 
 Northernmost town: Corumbá
 Southernmost town: Mundo Novo
 Westernmost town: Corumbá
 Easternmost town: Paranaíba

Minas Gerais 
 Northernmost town: Montalvânia
 Southernmost town: Camanducaia (the southernmost urban seat of a municipality, however, is Extrema)
 Westernmost town: Carneirinho
 Easternmost town: Salto da Divisa

Pará 
 Northernmost town: Almeirim
 Southernmost town: Santana do Araguaia
 Westernmost town: Oriximiná
 Easternmost town: Viseu

Paraíba 
 Northernmost town: Belém do Brejo do Cruz
 Southernmost town: São Sebastião do Umbuzeiro
 Westernmost town: Cachoeira dos Índios
 Easternmost town: João Pessoa

Paraná 
 Northernmost town: Jardim Olinda
 Southernmost town: General Carneiro (the southernmost urban seat of a municipality, however, is Palmas)
 Westernmost town: Foz do Iguaçu
 Easternmost town: Guaraqueçaba

Pernambuco 
 Northernmost town: Itapetim
 Southernmost town: Petrolina
 Westernmost town: Afrânio
 Easternmost town: Goiana

Piauí 
 Northernmost town: Ilha Grande
 Southernmost town: Cristalândia do Piauí
 Westernmost town: Santa Filomena
 Easternmost town: Pio IX

Rio de Janeiro 
 Northernmost town: Porciúncula
 Southernmost town: Paraty
 Westernmost town: Paraty
 Easternmost town: Campos dos Goytacazes (the easternmost urban seat of a municipality, however, is São João da Barra)

Rio Grande do Norte 
 Northernmost town: Tibau
 Southernmost town: Equador
 Westernmost town: Venha-Ver
 Easternmost town: Baía Formosa

Rio Grande do Sul 
 Northernmost town: Alpestre, Rio Grande do Sul
 Southernmost town: Santa Vitória do Palmar (the southernmost urban seat of a municipality, however, is Chuí)
 Westernmost town: Barra do Quaraí
 Easternmost town: Torres

Rondônia 
 Northernmost town: Porto Velho
 Southernmost town: Cabixi
 Westernmost town: Porto Velho
 Easternmost town: Vilhena

Roraima 
 Northernmost town: Uiramutã
 Southernmost town: Rorainópolis
 Westernmost town: Amajari
 Easternmost town: Caroebe

Santa Catarina  
 Northernmost town: Itapoá
 Southernmost town: Praia Grande
 Westernmost town: Itapiranga
 Easternmost town: Florianópolis

São Paulo  
 Northernmost town: Populina
 Southernmost town: Cananéia
 Westernmost town: Rosana
 Easternmost town: Bananal

Sergipe  
 Northernmost town: Canindé de São Francisco
 Southernmost town: Cristinápolis
 Westernmost town: Poço Verde
 Easternmost town: Brejo Grande

Tocantins  
 Northernmost town: São Sebastião do Tocantins
 Southernmost town: Paranã
 Westernmost town: Lagoa da Confusão
 Easternmost town: Mateiros

Elevation
 Highest elevation point: Pico da Neblina 2,994 m (9,823 ft) 
 Lowest elevation point: Atlantic Ocean 0 m

See also
 Geography of Brazil

References 

Borders of Brazil
Brazil